Caveolin-2 is a protein that in humans is encoded by the CAV2 gene.

The protein encoded by this gene is a major component of the inner surface of caveolae, small invaginations of the plasma membrane, and is involved in essential cellular functions, including signal transduction, lipid metabolism, cellular growth control and apoptosis. This protein may function as a tumor suppressor. CAV1 and CAV2 are located next to each other on chromosome 7 and express colocalizing proteins that form a stable hetero-oligomeric complex. Two transcript variants encoding distinct isoforms have been identified for this gene. By using alternative initiation codons in the same reading frame, two isoforms (alpha and beta) are encoded by one transcript.

Interactions
Caveolin 2 has been shown to interact with Caveolin 1 and RAS p21 protein activator 1.

References

Further reading